Luis Navarrete (born 13 January 1948) is a Cuban gymnast. He competed in eight events at the 1968 Summer Olympics.

References

1948 births
Living people
Cuban male artistic gymnasts
Olympic gymnasts of Cuba
Gymnasts at the 1968 Summer Olympics
Sportspeople from Havana